, formerly , with "Biwako" being a reference to Lake Biwa, is a Japanese football club based in Kusatsu, Shiga Prefecture, although they also play matches in Ōtsu and Konan. They currently play in Japan Football League, Japanese fourth tier of football league.

History 

The club was formed in 2005 from the former Sagawa Express SC Kyoto. They were first called FC Mi-O Biwako Kusatsu. In 2007, upon promotion to the JFL, they renamed themselves simply MIO Biwako Kusatsu until 2011.

Regional League and Promotion to JFL (–2007)
In 2007, they won third place in the regional playoffs and were promoted to the JFL for the 2008 season. They were promoted to Japan Football League for the first time at the end of 2007.

JFL (2008–)
The club played their first season in 2008 where they finished 14th.

In 2012, they renamed themselves MIO Biwako Shiga, in order to extend their fanbase to the entire extent of Shiga Prefecture, particularly the area around southern Lake Biwa, in where they mostly have played matches.

In 2022, MIO Biwako Shiga finished in the last place out of the 16 participating teams in the season. The club, however, was not relegated back to the Kansai League, as JFL's top 2 teams were promoted to the J3. Under the league system, MIO Biwako would only be relegated as the last-placed team if no team had earned promotion to the J3 during the season, which was not the case.

On 27 January 2023, MIO Biwako Shiga announced a name change, becoming Reilac Shiga FC from 2023. On 1 February 2023, the new identity was fully introduced with the new crest release.

They will play their 16th consecutive season of JFL football in 2023.

Changes in club name 
 Sagawa Express Kyoto Soccer Club : 2005
 FC Mi-O Biwako Kusatsu : 2006–2007
 MIO Biwako Kusatsu : 2008–2011
 MIO Biwako Shiga : 2012–2022
 Reilac Shiga FC : 2023–present

League and cup record 

Key

Current squad 
As of 14 March 2023.

Coaching staff
For the 2023 season.

Managerial history

References

External links 
Official site (Japanese)

 
Mi-O
Reilac
Sports teams in Shiga Prefecture
2005 establishments in Japan
Japan Football League clubs
Association football clubs established in 2005